Dasyspora is a genus of rust fungi in the family Uropyxidaceae.

Species
Dasyspora amazonica
Dasyspora echinata
Dasyspora emarginatae
Dasyspora ferrugineae
Dasyspora frutescentis
Dasyspora geranii-silvatici
Dasyspora gregaria
Dasyspora guianensis
Dasyspora malvacearum
Dasyspora mesoamericana
Dasyspora nitidae
Dasyspora segregaria
Dasyspora winteri

References

External links

Pucciniales